Dysgonomonas oryzarvi is a Gram-negative, short-rod-shaped, anaerobic and non-motile bacterium from the genus of Dysgonomonas.

References

External links
Type strain of Dysgonomonas oryzarvi at BacDive -  the Bacterial Diversity Metadatabase

Bacteroidia
Bacteria described in 2012